Wasting Time may refer to:

Idleness, a lack of motion or energy
Goofing off, engaging in an idle pastime while neglecting obligations
Procrastination, avoidance of doing a task
Running out the clock, in sports, stalling or playing with the purpose of allowing time to expire
Time sink, an activity, especially one seen as wasteful, that consumes a significant amount of time

Music

Albums
Wasting Time, by Mest, 2000

Songs
"Wasting Time" (Blink-182 song), 1996
"Wasting Time" (Brent Faiyaz song), 2021
"Wasting Time" (Thirsty Merc song), 2003
"Wasting Time", by Collective Soul from Hints Allegations and Things Left Unsaid, 1994
"Wasting Time", by Jack Johnson from On and On, 2003
"Wasting Time", by Juliana Hatfield from There's Always Another Girl, 2011
"Wasting Time", by Kid Rock from Devil Without a Cause, 2000
"Wasting Time (Eternal Summer)", by Four Year Strong from Enemy of the World, 2010
"Social Secs/Wasting Time", by The Stranglers from reissues of Black and White, 2016

See also
Wasted Time (disambiguation)
Wasting My Time (disambiguation)
"Waste Time", a song by the Fire Theft from their self-titled album